The Driver Era (TDE) (stylized as THE DRIVER ERΛ) is an American music duo consisting of brothers Rocky and Ross Lynch. Both are former members of the now defunct pop rock band R5.

History

2018–present: R5 to The Driver Era and Preacher Man 
On March 1, 2018, R5's Instagram and Twitter handles were changed to The Driver Era and all of R5's previous posts were deleted. On March 2, 2018, Ross announced via Instagram story that The Driver Era would be a band consisting of him and his brother Rocky. On the same day as their social media changes, previews of their debut single "Preacher Man" were posted on Twitter and Instagram. The name 'The Driver Era' came from a conversation between Rocky and Ross during a car ride to a party, and the brothers agreed that this name encompassed where their music was headed.

On March 16, 2018, they released "Preacher Man", along with its video a few weeks later. This single was met with high amounts of praise from the alternative/indie music scene. The video was based around a mixture of religions and sins. "Preacher Man" became the band's iconic song from the offing, the band having only released that song for a long period of time. The band also teased "Mary Jane", a song which was performed by Rocky but has never been released. This song was suspected to be their next single but that never came around.

On May 25, 2018, The Driver Era released two special remixes of "Preacher Man".
On August 24, 2018, The Driver Era released a new single, "Afterglow", originally being released via YouTube before eventually being put onto Spotify. Along this period, the band also leaked their own song "My Silver Lining Is Overdue", a track which was due to be used in the film "Turnover" featuring band member and brother, Riker Lynch.

On October 26, 2018, The Driver Era released a new single, "Low ", followed by a special remix a few months later. "Low" was popular for being the band's first official single that was sung by guitarist and producer Rocky Lynch, as opposed to by being sung by vocalist Ross Lynch.

On March 29, 2019, The Driver Era released a new single, "Feel You Now", followed by its video a few weeks later. This came after the band teased multiple songs throughout a YouTube video titled "Haven't left the garage" including "Feel You now", "Welcome To The End Of Your Life", "San Francisco" and "Scared of Heights". Alongside those 4 songs was a unnamed song that is yet to be revealed.

On April 26, 2019, The Driver Era released a new single, "Welcome to the End of your Life", followed by its video a few weeks later. This was a song the band had teased multiple times throughout 2019 up until the point of release, revealing how it was a song that excited them during the production.

On June 13, 2019, The Driver Era premiered their new music video for "Low" and announced their debut studio album, titled "X". The album was released on June 28, 2019, including the previous singles and a handful of new songs that had previously been performed on the tour.

On October 25, 2019, The Driver Era released two singles, "A Kiss" and "Forever Always".

On April 2, 2020, The Driver Era released more two singles "OMG Plz Don’t Come Around" and "Flashdrive", from their upcoming second album, rumored to be released in the late summer, which would later be delayed primarily due to the Covid-19 pandemic putting strains on the band's 'creative juices'.

On April 23, 2021, during a Youtube Live dedicated to MTV Friday Livestream's 1st birthday, The Driver Era announced their new single "Heaven Angel", to be released within the following four weeks. Weeks later, the band released "#1 Fan" and "Leave Me Feeling Confident" before finally announcing and then releasing "Girlfriend", their second studio album. Following by "The Girlfriend Tour" with dates in US, Asia, Australia and Europe in both 2021 and 2022.

On June 30, 2022, The Driver Era released a new single, "Keep Moving Forward" featuring Nikka Costa, and "Malibu" on July 28, 2022. On August 4, 2022, The Driver Era announced their third studio album, titled "Summer Mixtape", which released on September 16, 2022.

Band members

Current members
 Ross Lynch (2018–present) – lead vocals, rhythm guitar
 Rocky Lynch (2018–present) – lead guitar, vocals

Touring members
Current 
 Riker Lynch (2018–present) – bass guitar, backing vocals
 Dave Briggs (2022–present) – drums
 Garrison Jones (2022–present) – keyboards

Former
Ellington Ratliff (2018–2019; 2022) – drums, percussion, backing vocals
 Rydel Lynch (2018–2022) – keyboards, backing vocals
Chase Meyer (2020–2021) – drums, percussion

Discography

Studio albums

Extended plays

Singles

Promotional singles

Other appearances

Music videos

Tours

Headlining
 The Driver Era Live! (2019)
 The Girlfriend Tour (2021–2022)
 Summer Tour 2022 (2022)

References 

American pop music groups
Musical groups established in 2018
R5 (band)
Sibling musical duos
2018 establishments in California